Cane Creek is a  long 4th order tributary to the Haw River, in Alamance County, North Carolina.  This Cane Creek is located on the right bank of the Haw River.

Course
Cane Creek rises northwest of Pleasantville, North Carolina in Alamance County, North Carolina and then flows east to the Haw River about 3 miles southeast of Eli Whitney.

Watershed
Cane Creek drains  of area, receives about 47.1 in/year of precipitation, and has a wetness index of 419.17 and is about 45% forested.

See also
Cane Creek (Haw River tributary, left bank)

References

Rivers of North Carolina
Rivers of Alamance County, North Carolina